The 1990 The Citadel Bulldogs football team represented The Citadel, The Military College of South Carolina in the 1990 NCAA Division I-AA football season. The Bulldogs were led by fourth-year head coach Charlie Taaffe and played their home games at Johnson Hagood Stadium. They played as members of the Southern Conference, as they have since 1936.  In 1990, The Citadel made their second appearance in the I-AA playoffs, and second in three years.

Schedule

Game summaries

William & Mary

Air Force

Marshall

Appalachian State

Western Carolina

Chattanooga

South Carolina

East Tennessee State

VMI

Wofford

Furman

Georgia Southern

Ranking movements

References

Citadel Bulldogs
The Citadel Bulldogs football seasons
Citadel football